Nick Koster (8 January 2003) is a Dutch footballer who plays for Jong AZ and the Netherlands U19 as an attacker.

Career
Koster switched to the academy at AZ in 2019 from AFC Amsterdam. He signed a professional contract with AZ in June 2021 taking him through to the summer of 2023 with AZ, with the option of an extra season. Koster made his debut for Jong AZ when appearing as a substitute on 1 November, 2021 against Jong PSV in a 2-0 away defeat. Koster combined the 2021-22 season playing for Jong AZ in the Eerste Divisie with featuring for AZ in the UEFA Youth League.

International career
Koster was called up to the Netherlands U19 squad in October 2021.

References

External links
 

Living people
2003 births
Dutch footballers
Eerste Divisie players